Neighbourhood is a Chinese drama series which is co-produce by mm2 Entertainment and ntv7.
It will be aired every Monday to Thursday, at 10:00pm on Malaysia's ntv7 in 2010.

Cast
 Frederick Lee
 Danielle Dai
 Leslie Chai
 Angie Seow
 Mayjune Tan

References

Chinese-language drama television series in Malaysia
2010 Malaysian television series debuts
2010 Malaysian television series endings
NTV7 original programming